Ocaklı can refer to:

 Ocaklı, Aşkale
 Ocaklı, Dinar
 Ocaklı, Gelibolu
 Ocaklı, Nazilli